This is a list of Panjabi films of the 1940s. For a complete alphabetical list, see :Category:Punjabi films.

1940s

References

External links 
 Punjabi films at the Internet Movie Database

1940s
Lists of 1940s films
Films